Fernando Beltrán Cruz (born 8 May 1998), also known as Nene, is a Mexican professional footballer who plays as a midfielder for Liga MX club Guadalajara.

Club career
Beltrán first joined Atlante's youth academy in 2012 taking part in U-15 and third division squad and then briefly joined Santos Laguna's Escuela de Alto Rendimiento in 2014. He was scouted and joined Guadalajara's youth academy in 2014, managing to go through U-17 and U-20 youth system.

Beltrán debuted with the first-team under Matías Almeyda against Tigres UANL in the 2017 Campeón de Campeones on 16 July 2017 which ended in a 1–0 loss. Six days later, he made his league debut against Toluca in a 0–0 draw. On 25 January 2020, he would score his first league goal for Guadalajara against Toluca in a 2–2 draw.

In October 2020, he renewed his contract with Guadalajara, remaining with the club through 2024.

International career

Youth
In May 2019, Beltrán was called up by Jaime Lozano to participate with the under-22 squad in that year's Toulon Tournament, where Mexico would place third in the competition.

Beltrán was called up to participate in the 2020 Summer Olympics. He won the bronze medal with the Olympic team.

Senior
In September 2020, Beltrán received his first senior national team call up by Gerardo Martino for a training camp. At the end of the  month, he made his debut with the national team in a friendly match against Guatemala, coming on as a substitute during the second half for a 3–0 victory.

Career statistics

Club

International

Honours
Guadalajara
CONCACAF Champions League: 2018

Mexico U23
Olympic Bronze Medal: 2020

Individual
Liga MX All-Star: 2022

References

External links

1998 births
Living people
C.D. Guadalajara footballers
Liga MX players
Association football midfielders
Mexican footballers
Mexico youth international footballers
Mexico international footballers
Footballers at the 2020 Summer Olympics
Olympic footballers of Mexico
Olympic medalists in football
Olympic bronze medalists for Mexico
Medalists at the 2020 Summer Olympics